Demophoo hammatus is a species of beetle in the family Cerambycidae, and the only species in the genus Demophoo. It was described by Chabrillac in 1857.

References

Anisocerini
Beetles described in 1857
Monotypic Cerambycidae genera